The O. N. V. Literary Award is awarded annually by O. N. V. Cultural Academy from 2017 in memory of poet O. N. V. Kurup (1931–2016). The award is a national award for which writers from across India are considered for their overall contributions to literature. But so far, only Malayalam–language authors have received the award. The award comprises a statue, a citation, and a purse of  300,000.

Recipients

References

Indian literary awards
Awards established in 2017
Malayalam literary awards
2017 establishments in Kerala